This is a list of notable men's and women's football clubs that competed within the leagues and divisions of the French football league system during the 2022–23 season. Also included are clubs from outside France that play within the French system (suitably highlighted).

By league and division

National leagues
Professional divisions
Ligue 1 (level 1)
Ligue 2 (level 2)
Semi-professional division
National (level 3)
Amateur divisions
National 2 (level 4)
National 3 (level 5)

Regional and district leagues
Structure of leagues from level 6 and below can be viewed at French football league system.

Alphabetical list



A

B

C

D

E

F

G

H

I

J

L

M

N

O

P

Q

R

S

T

V

W

Y

Notes 

 
France
Football clubs
Football